Rockford Lutheran High School is a private school in Rockford, Illinois.  Established in 1964, Rockford Lutheran High School is associated with 25 area Lutheran Churches. The Lutheran churches have associations with both ELCA and LCMS.  Students attend more than 100 area churches; 49% attend a Lutheran church.  More than 2,000 students have graduated from Rockford Lutheran High School since the first graduating class in 1969.  The school's mascot is the Crusader and the school colors are purple and white.

Athletics and extra-curricular activity 
The High School (grades 9-12) competes in the Big Northern Conference.  The Junior High School (grades 7-8) competes in the Big Northern Conference.  The school has three gymnasiums, lighted track and field complex, Baseball field. Softball field, and a weight room.

Athletics
Boys - Baseball, Basketball, Bowling, Cross Country, Football, Golf, Soccer, Tennis, Track, Wrestling, Bass fishing, Volleyball.
Girls - Basketball, Bowling, Cross Country, Golf, Soccer, Softball, Spirit Squad, Tennis, Track, Volleyball, Bass Fishing, Swimming

Notable alumni

James Robinson, running back for the New York Jets
Stephanie Raymond, guard for the Chicago Sky
Nate Wieting, tight end for the New York Giants

References

External links
 Official website

Private elementary schools in Illinois
Private middle schools in Illinois
Private high schools in Illinois
Lutheran schools in Illinois
High schools in Rockford, Illinois
Educational institutions established in 1964
1964 establishments in Illinois
Secondary schools affiliated with the Lutheran Church–Missouri Synod
Evangelical Lutheran Church in America schools